A list of films produced in Russia in 2016 (see 2016 in film).

Film releases

See also
 2016 in film
 2016 in Russia

References

External links

2016
Films
Russia